Georges Villa (24 January 1883 – 19 November 1965) was a French painter. His work was part of the painting event in the art competition at the 1924 Summer Olympics.

References

Further reading
 Christian Wagner: "Georges Villa (1883-1965). Une palette de talent". Histoires N°3, Société Historique et Archéologique du pays de Bourmont (S.H.A.B.), 135 pages, June 2021
 Verdun-Meuse.fr: Georges Villa, peintre et caricaturiste
 RKD.nl - Georges Villa
 Bénézit (subscription only)
 AGORHA - Georges Villa

1883 births
1965 deaths
19th-century French painters
20th-century French painters
20th-century French male artists
French male painters
Olympic competitors in art competitions
People from Meuse (department)
19th-century French male artists